Hrishikesh Hemant Kanitkar (born 14 November 1974) is a former Indian cricketer, who played Tests and ODIs.

He is a left-handed batsman and a right-arm offbreak bowler. When he retired in 2015, he was one of only three batsmen to have scored 8000-plus runs in the Ranji Trophy and also the only captain in the Ranji Trophy's history to lift the Elite and Plate league titles.

Domestic career 

He made his first-class debut against the Sanjay Manjrekar led Mumbai cricket team at Indira Gandhi Stadium, Solapur, which was drawn in the 1994–95 Ranji Trophy.

He scored prolifically for the Maharashtra cricket team in the Ranji Trophy and brought himself into contention for national selection. Although off the international scene for quite some time, Kanitkar joined the Brentwood Cricket Club in Essex for the 2006 season. During this season he enjoyed the English conditions, scoring over 1000 runs throughout the season with an average of 76.

Kanitkar played for the Rajasthan Ranji team as a senior player. In 2010-11 Ranji Trophy season, he captained the Rajasthan Team in the Ranji Trophy and led them to their maiden Ranji Trophy triumph after defeating Baroda in the finals.

In December 2012, he became the 27th cricketer to play 100 Ranji Trophy matches.

In July 2015 Kanitkar announced his retirement from cricket.

International career 

He is best remembered for hitting a four when India required 3 runs to win from 2 balls in the Silver Jubilee Independence Cup final at Dhaka, against Pakistan cricket team in fading light, to complete the Indian victory. He played only a few ODIs and scored only one half-century in the format (which came in his third ODI innings against the Australia cricket team in Kochi).

He only had a brief international test career in which he played in two tests in 1999/00 both against Australian cricket team at Melbourne and Sydney. He scored 11 and 45 in a Boxing Day Test at Melbourne Cricket Ground as the Indian cricket team lost by 180 runs. In his second Test, Kanitkar scored 10 and 8 as India was defeated by an innings and 141 runs and Kanitkar never played Test match again.

Coaching career 

In 2011, Kanitkar was appointed as an assistant coach of Kochi Tuskers Kerala but walked out of the contract even before the IPL season began. This was due to disputes with the owners.

Kanitkar was named as head coach of the Goa cricket team for 2015–16 Ranji Trophy season with a one-year contract.

Kanitkar then became the head coach of the Tamil Nadu cricket team from 2016 - 2019. He excelled as a coach for Tamil Nadu and was credited with turning around the fortunes of the team. Along with Lakshmipati Balaji, as the full-time bowling coach, Kanitkar was credited with making a major change in the team.

In the run-up to ICC Women's T20 World Cup 2023, Hrishikesh Kanitkar was named the Stand-In Chief Coach of the India women's national cricket team

Personal life 

He is the son of former Indian wicket-keeper Hemant Kanitkar who also played in two Tests.

References

1974 births
Living people
Indian cricketers
India Test cricketers
India One Day International cricketers
West Zone cricketers
Rajasthan cricketers
Maharashtra cricketers
Madhya Pradesh cricketers
Central Zone cricketers
Indian Premier League coaches
Cricketers from Maharashtra
Indian cricket coaches
Rajasthan cricket captains